Wesley Koolhof and Matwé Middelkoop were the defending champions but lost in the quarterfinals to Sander Arends and Adam Majchrowicz.

Sander Gillé and Joran Vliegen won the title after defeating Tomasz Bednarek and Roman Jebavý 6–2, 7–5 in the final.

Seeds

Draw

References
 Main Draw

STRABAG Challenger Open - Doubles
STRABAG Challenger Open